Townhill may refer to:

Townhill, County Fermanagh, a townland in County Fermanagh, Northern Ireland
Townhill, Fife, a village in Scotland
Townhill, Swansea, a hill and community in Wales
Townhill (electoral ward), an electoral ward
An area in the town of Hamilton, South Lanarkshire, Scotland
Townhill Park, a suburb of Southampton

See also
 
 Town Hill (disambiguation)
 Hill Town, California
 Hilltown (disambiguation)